Pterolophia maacki is a species of beetle in the family Cerambycidae. It was described by Blessig in 1873. It is known from Mongolia.

References

maacki
Beetles described in 1873